Rodrigo Iñigo del Hoyo (born August 29, 1985, in Mexico City) is a Mexican former professional footballer who last played for CD El Álamo.

Career
He made his debut February 10, 2007 against Veracruz. A game which resulted in a 4–2 victory for América. After 3 years at América, Iñigo moved to Querétaro F.C. before moving the back to América the following year. Following his release for América, he joined Championship side Cardiff City on a two-week trial. Shortly after, he went on to return to play in Mexico, and currently is playing in Mineros de Zacatecas.

References

External links
 Rodrigo Íñigo's Statistics
  Rodrigo Iñigo's Statistics
 
 Rodrigo Íñigo at La Preferente

1985 births
Mexican footballers
Mexican expatriate footballers
Living people
Footballers from Mexico City
Liga MX players
Ascenso MX players
USL Championship players
Tercera División players
Club América footballers
Querétaro F.C. footballers
Lobos BUAP footballers
Club Puebla players
Tecos F.C. footballers
CD San Roque de Lepe footballers
Las Vegas Lights FC players
Association football defenders
Mexican expatriate sportspeople in Spain
Mexican expatriate sportspeople in the United States
Expatriate footballers in Spain
Expatriate soccer players in the United States